The 2018 WCHA Men's Ice Hockey Tournament was played between March 2 and March 17, 2018, on campus locations. By winning the tournament, Michigan Tech was awarded the Broadmoor Trophy and received the WCHA's automatic bid to the 2018 NCAA Division I Men's Ice Hockey Tournament.

Format
The first two rounds of the postseason tournament featured a best-of-three games format. The top eight conference teams participated in the tournament. Teams were seeded No. 1 through No. 8 according to their final conference standings, with a tiebreaker system used to seed teams with an identical number of points accumulated. The higher seeded teams each earned home ice and host one of the lower seeded teams.

The final was a single game held at the campus site of the highest remaining seed.

Conference standings
Note: GP = Games played; W = Wins; L = Losses; T = Ties; PTS = Points; GF = Goals For; GA = Goals Against

Bracket
Teams are reseeded after the first round

Note: * denotes overtime periods

Results

Quarterfinals

(1) Minnesota State vs. (8) Alaska

(2) Northern Michigan vs. (7) Alabama–Huntsville

(3) Bowling Green vs. (6) Ferris State

(4) Bemidji State vs. (5) Michigan Tech

Semifinals

(1) Minnesota State vs. (5) Michigan Tech

(2) Northern Michigan vs. (3) Bowling Green

Championship

(2) Northern Michigan vs. (5) Michigan Tech

Tournament awards

Most Outstanding Player
Patrick Munson (Michigan Tech)

References

WCHA Men's Ice Hockey Tournament
WCHA Men's Ice Hockey Tournament